The Others are an English rock band. They signed to Poptones in July 2004 and their eponymous debut album was released on 31 January 2005.

Career
The band formed in 2002 and quickly became renowned for their riotous live shows. By 2004, they had started to perform so-called "guerilla gigs", which saw them play on a Hammersmith & City line tube train, on the dodgems at the Leeds festival, and on the famous Abbey Road crossing in London. The band, particularly lead singer Dominic Masters (born 12 December 1977), maintain a close relationship with their fanbase, affectionately known as the 853 Kamikaze Stage-Diving Division. The band are also known for accessibility which resulted in the popularity of the websites forum, which played a key part in keeping the fanbase together and organizing the following to collect together for gigs.

Their self-titled debut album divided critics and public alike on its release in 2005. Whilst NME gave it 8/10, Q rated it one of the worst albums of the year, mocking Masters' boastful attitude towards drug abuse. However, the album did spawn three Top 40 singles for the band; while debut single "This Is for the Poor", narrowly missed the top 40 on its release in April 2004, "Stan Bowles" reached No. 36 in November 2004.

In January 2005, their third single, "Lackey", reached No. 21 in January 2005 and in April of that year the NME awarded The Others the John Peel Innovation Award at the Brat Awards. Following this, "William" became the band's fourth and final single from their debut album charting at No. 29.

In an interview with Phoenix FM in December 2005, the band confirmed that they had left Poptones and, in October 2006, they released their second album, Inward Parts. Three singles were released from this album, "The Truth That Hurts" (in 2006), "Always Be Mine" (2007) and "Probate" (2008).  In August 2007, drummer Martin Oldham left the band for health reasons. Further UK and European live dates followed and in February 2008, the band went on a temporary hiatus.

After a quiet period, The Others played their first live show in three years, a sold-out show at The Lexington in London. One month later they decamped to a studio in Kent to record eight new songs. In April 2012, the band released the double A side single, "Hardly Know Me" / "I'll Keep You Safe"; their first new material in four years and this was accompanied by a two-week UK tour.

On Christmas Eve 2012, the band gave away the demos for the third album; Songs for the Disillusioned for free. This news was subsequently covered by the NME. The response was tremendous, going viral and picking up coverage from the UK, as well as Spain, France, Germany, Argentina and Italy amongst others. The free download allocation was reached within two days and in order to meet demand and keep the tracks available for free, they had to be uploaded to four separate sites.

In January 2013, the band announced their decision to offer fans a free download package for every month of 2013. This news was subsequently reported by the digitalspy website. As part of the band's comeback they returned to the Glastonbury Festival to play on the William's Green Stage. This was the first time the band had played the festival for eight years, ever since playing on The Other Stage in 2005.

On Christmas Eve 2013, the band followed their third album demos giveaway by giving away the re-recorded, remixed and properly produced version of Songs for the Disillusioned for free.

Members

Current
Dominic Masters – vocals
Johnny Others – guitar, bass
Jimmy Lager – guitar
Joseph Gardiner-Lowe – drums
Eddie Darko – bass, guitar
Alex S Tower (Stef) - keys
Steve McCready – bass, guitar

Former
James Le Masurier – drums
Martin Oldham – drums
James Moulson – drums, keyboards, electronics, guitar, bass

Discography

Studio albums
 The Others (31 January 2005) UK number 51
 Inward Parts (30 October 2006)
 Songs for the Disillusioned (24 December 2013)

Demo album
 (Demos for) Songs for the Disillusioned (24 December 2012)

Singles

References

External links
Dominic Masters' podcast show
Phoenix FM interview with Dominic Masters, December 2005
Photos of The Others live in concert in May 2004
Johnny Others' interview on MusicTowers
[ Debut album review at Allmusic.com]

Musical groups from London
British indie rock groups